Delisea elegans is a species of red algae.

References

External links 

 

Bonnemaisoniales
Species described in 1819